The North American Single-footing Horse, also called the Single-footing Horse or Single-footer, is a horse breed originating in the southern United States. The term "single-foot" refers to an intermediate ambling gait, sometimes alternately called the rack or paso largo, where the horse lifts each foot up separately and puts it down alone.

Characteristics
The Single-footing Horse comes in a wide range of colors, including palomino and buckskin, as well as chestnut, gray, and bay.
The Single-footing Horse is a medium-sized breed of light riding horse. It is primarily known for its intermediate four-beat gait, which may range from 7 to 9 miles per hour on a trail ride to over 15 miles per hour at a road speed. High speeds in excess of 20 mph have been recorded.

Uses
The breed is almost always used for trail or pleasure riding. All Single-footers must be shod in plain keg shoes (a standard machine-made shoe) in order to maintain registration.

History
The Single-footing Horse is descended from crosses of American Saddlebreds, Standardbreds, and other gaited breeds, with some influence from Spanish bloodlines. An influential stallion was EZD Falcon Rowdy, who also influenced the Racking Horse breed.

Sources

Horse breeds